Aurimas Taurantas (born February 7, 1956 in Vilnius) is a Lithuanian politician.  In 1990 he was among those who signed the Act of the Re-Establishment of the State of Lithuania.

References
 Biography

1956 births
Living people
Politicians from Vilnius